The Nokia Asha 303 is a QWERTY messenger phone powered by Nokia's Series 40 operating system. It was announced at Nokia World 2011 in London along with three others Asha phones - the Nokia Asha 200, 201 and 300. The 303 is considered to be the flagship of the Asha family. Its main features are the QWERTY keyboard and capacitive touchscreen, the pentaband 3G radio, SIP VoIP over 3G and Wi-Fi and the ability to play Angry Birds which were all never seen before on a Series 40 phone. Nokia Asha 303 is available in a number of languages depending on which territory it is marketed for. Models sold in South Asia support at least eight languages: English, Hindi, Gujarati, Marathi, Tamil, Kannada, Telugu and Malayalam.

History and availability 
The Nokia Asha 303 was announced at Nokia World 2011 in London. It will be available shortly in China, Eurasia, Europe, India, Latin America, Middle East and Southeast Asian markets. The phone will be sold at a price of €115 subject to taxes and subsidies.

Hardware

Processors 
The Nokia Asha 303 is powered by the same 1 GHz ARM11 processor found in Symbian Belle phones such as the Nokia 500, 600 and 700 but lack the dedicated Broadcom GPU which is not supported by the Nokia Series 40 operating system. The system also has 128 MB of low power single channel RAM (Mobile DDR).

Screen and input 
The Nokia Asha 303 has a 2.6-inch (66 mm) transmissive LCD capacitive touchscreen (1 point) with a resolution of 320 × 240 pixel (QVGA, 154 ppi). In contrast with the Nokia C3-00, the screen of the Asha 303 is taller than wider (portrait). According to Nokia it is capable of displaying up to 262 thousands colors. The device also has a backlit 4-row keyboard with regional variant available (QWERTY, AZERTY, etc. ...).

The back camera has an extended depth of field feature (no mechanical zoom), no flash and has a 4× digital zoom for both video and camera. The sensor size of the back camera is 3.2-megapixel (2048 x 1536 px), has a f/2.8 aperture and a 50 cm to infinity focus range. It is capable of video recording at up to 640 x 480 px at 15 fps with mono sound.

Buttons 
On the front of the device, above the 4-row keyboard, there the answer/call key, the messaging key which brings up an onscreen menu (instant messaging and e-mail), the music key which also brings up an onscreen menu (last song/rewind, play/pause, next song/fast forward) and the end call/close application key. On the right side of the device there are the volume rocker and the lock/unlock button. A long press on the space bar brings up the wireless network menu.

Audio and output 
The Nokia Asha 303 has one microphone and a loudspeaker, which is situated on the back of the device below the anodized aluminum battery cover. On the top, there is a 3.5 mm AV connector which simultaneously provides stereo audio output and microphone input. Between the 3.5 mm AV connector and the 2 mm charging connector, there is a High-Speed USB 2.0 USB Micro AB connector provided for data synchronization, battery charging and supports for USB On-The-Go 1.3 (the ability to act as a USB host) using a Nokia Adapter Cable for USB OTG CA-157 (not included upon purchase).

The built-in Bluetooth v2.1 +EDR (Enhanced Data Rate) supports stereo audio output with the A2DP profile. Built-in car hands-free kits are also supported with the HFP profile. File transfer is supported (FTP) along with the OPP profile for sending/receiving objects. It is possible to remote control the device with the AVRCP profile. It supports wireless earpieces and headphones through the HSP profile. The DUN profile which permits access to the Internet from a laptop by dialing up on a mobile phone wirelessly (tethering) and PAN profile for networking using Bluetooth are also supported. The device also functions as an FM receiver, allowing one to listen to the FM radio by using headphones connected to the 3.5 jack as antenna.

Battery and SIM 
The battery life of the BP-3L (1300 mAh) as claimed by Nokia is from 7 to 8 hours of talk time, from 30 to 35 days of standby and 47 hours of music playback depending on actual usage.

The SIM card is located under the battery which can be accessed by removing the back panel of the device. The microSDHC card socket is also located under the back cover (but not under the battery). No tool is necessary to remove the back panel.

Storage 
The phone has 150 MB of available non-removable storage. Additional storage is available via a microSDHC card socket, which is certified to support up to 32 GB of additional storage.

Software 
The Nokia Asha 303 is powered by Nokia Series 40 operating system with service pack 1 for touchscreen devices and comes with a variety of applications:

 Web: Nokia (proxy) Browser for Series 40
 Conversations: Nokia Messaging Service 3.2 (instant messaging and e-mail) and SMS, MMS
 Social: Facebook, Twitter, Flickr, Orkut and instagram
 Media: Camera, Photos, Music player, Nokia Music Store (on selected market), Flash Lite 3.0 (for YouTube video), Video player
 Personal Information Management: Calendar, Detailed contact information
 Utilities: VoIP, Notes, Calculator, To-do list, Alarm clock, Voice recorder, Stopwatch
 Games: Angry Birds Lite (first level only, additional levels can be purchased on the Nokia Store)

The Home screen is customizable and allow the user to add, amongst others, favorite contacts, Twitter/Facebook feeds, applications shortcuts, IM/e-mail notifications and calendar alert.

The phone also integrate a basic form of finger gesture (marketed by Nokia as Swype), as first seen on the Nokia N9, to navigate the user interface. For example, on the homescreen, the user has to swipe their finger from the left side of the bezel surrounding the screen to the opposite side to bring up the application drawer. A swipe from the right side will bring up the calendar application; this can be configured to fit the user preferences.

The device comes with Nokia Maps for Series 40 and make use of cellular network for positioning as there is no GPS in the phone. Nokia Maps for Series 40 phones does not provide voice guided navigation and only allows for basic route (<10 km) to be plan. The software will provide step by step instructions, allows the user to see the route on a map and search for nearby points of interest. Depending on where the phone was purchased, regional maps (Europe, South America, etc.) are preloaded and, as such, an active internet connection to download map data is not required.

See also
 List of Nokia products
 Comparison of smartphones

References

External links
 http://www.nokia.com/nokia-asha-smarter-mobile-phones
 http://europe.nokia.com/find-products/devices/nokia-asha-303/specifications
 http://www.developer.nokia.com/Devices/Device_specifications/303
 https://www.webcitation.org/6B7hfLoMa?url=http://www.developer.nokia.com/Community/Wiki/VoIP_support_in_Nokia_devices#Support_in_Series_40_devices

Nokia smartphones